Coleophora amseliella is a moth of the family Coleophoridae that can be found in Afghanistan, Iran and Turkmenistan.

The larvae feed on Girgensohnia oppositiflora. They feed on the generative organs of their host plant.

References

External links

amseliella
Moths of Asia
Moths described in 1967